Taobat is a village in Sharda Tehsil in Neelam Valley, Azad Kashmir, Pakistan. It is the last station in Neelam valley. It is also the nearest location from where Neelam River enters Pakistani territory and becomes River Neelum.

Taobat is accessible from Kel by unmetalled road. There is a motel of AJK Tourism and Archeology Department and a small number of hotels.

See also
Keran
Kutton
Sharda

References

Hill stations in Pakistan
2005 Kashmir earthquake
Populated places in Neelam District
Tourist attractions in Azad Kashmir